Il pranzo della domenica (Sunday Lunch) is a 2003 Italian comedy film directed by Carlo Vanzina. For her performance Giovanna Ralli was nominated for Nastro d'Argento for Best Supporting Actress, while Rocco Papaleo and Maurizio Mattioli were both nominated for Nastro d'Argento for Best Supporting Actor.

Plot 
Franca Malorni has three daughters with whom she has an obsessive relationship. In fact, she can not break away from them and pretend that every Sunday the girls are from her to eat lunch with their families. When Franca breaks femur and goes to the hospital, the three daughters begin to think about the will...

Cast 
Massimo Ghini: Massimo Papi
Elena Sofia Ricci: Sofia Lo Iacono
Barbara De Rossi: Barbara
Galatea Ranzi: Susanna Papi
Rocco Papaleo: Nicola Lo Iacono
Maurizio Mattioli: Maurizio 
Giovanna Ralli: Franca Malorni
Paolo Triestino:  Luzi
Marco Messeri: Marquis 
Gianfranco Barra: On. Torrisi 
Angelo Bernabucci: Consigliere Calcio

References

External links

2003 films
Films directed by Carlo Vanzina
Italian comedy films
2003 comedy films
2000s Italian-language films